Karimpuzha may refer to:
 Karimpuzha, Palakkad, a village in Palakkad district, Kerala, India
 Karimpuzha (Malappuram), a river in Kerala
 Karimpuzha Sree Ramaswamy Temple, a Hindu temple located in Ottapalam taluk, Palakkad district.